Muhammad Lablur Rahman (born 5 October 1983) is a first-class and List A cricketer from Bangladesh. A right-handed batsman and wicket keeper, he is sometimes known by his nickname Lablu.  He made his debut for Dhaka Division in First-class cricket in 2000/01 and also played for them during 2001/02. He reappeared for Barisal Division in 2006/07. His best score with the bat, 49, came against Khulna Division.

References

Dhaka Division cricketers
Living people
1983 births
Bangladeshi cricketers
Barisal Division cricketers
Wicket-keepers